Lamrim Yeshe Nyingpo is a terma revealed by Chokgyur Lingpa in the 19th Century.

The Light of Wisdom (1999) is an extended exegesis on the Lamrim Yeshe Nyingpo by Jamgön Kongtrül the Great, one of the eminent Buddhist masters of nineteenth-century Tibet.

References 
Padmasambhava & Kongtrül, Jamgön (transl. Erik Pema Kunsang) (1999). The Light of Wisdom (Vol. 1). Boudhanath:  Rangjung Yeshe Publications. (A translation of the Lamrim Yeshe Nyingpo)
Introduction: context and lineages for Lamrim Yeshe Nyingpo

Tibetan Buddhist texts
Vajrayana